Håkon Mosby (10 July 1903 – 18 October 1989) was a Norwegian oceanographer.

Mosby was born in Kristiansand to headmaster Salve Mosby and Mette Catrine Nodeland. He was appointed professor of physical oceanography at the University of Bergen from 1948, and served as rector from 1966 to 1971.

See also
Mosby Glacier
Mosbytoppane

References

1903 births
1989 deaths
People from Kristiansand
Norwegian oceanographers
Academic staff of the University of Bergen
Rectors of the University of Bergen
Members of the Norwegian Academy of Science and Letters